The following events occurred in September 1925:

September 1, 1925 (Tuesday)
Nicaraguan President Carlos José Solórzano declared martial law in the country as it was unclear whether the rebels would uphold their promise to vacate the mountain-top fortress of La Loma.
A Spanish troop transport carrying 1,000 foreign legion troops was sunk in Alhucemas Bay by Rif shelling.
Danish seamen went on strike over their employers' refusal to raise wages. With seamen also on strike in China and across the British Empire, a large portion of the world's commerce was disrupted.
John Rodgers' seaplane touched down in the Pacific Ocean short of the goal of Honolulu due to a lack of favorable winds. Although naval ships were stationed at intervals along the route, the plane ran out of gas trying to locate one, and the seaplane's fate was not known to the public at the time.

September 2, 1925 (Wednesday)
The Australian government announced new tariffs that included preferences for British goods. 
Ship owners told Australian seamen that they would face no reprisals for their outlaw strike if they returned to duty within 48 hours.
John Rodgers and his crew removed the fabric off of their seaplane's wing, rigged it for sailing and headed for Hawaii.

September 3, 1925 (Thursday)
The U.S. dirigible  broke up in a squall line near Caldwell, Ohio; 14 crewmen were killed.
Naval vessels and scouting planes spent a second day searching in vain for the missing seaplane of John Rodgers and his crew.
The Second International Conference on the Standardization of Medicine has held in Geneva, with the goal of standardizing drug formulae worldwide.
Born: Shoista Mullojonova, singer, in Dushanbe, Tajik ASSR (d. 2010)

September 4, 1925 (Friday)
Rif rebels launched an offensive toward the Spanish-held city of Tétouan.
Born: Elias Hrawi, 14th President of Lebanon, in Zahlé (d. 2006)

September 5, 1925 (Saturday)
Canadian Prime Minister William Lyon Mackenzie King announced that the 14th Parliament was dissolved and that new elections were to be held on October 29.
The ocean liner SS Sophocles barricaded its striking sailors into the ship and then pulled out of Cape Town, South Africa en route to Australia, but was forced to turn around and go back when the sailors refused to work.

September 6, 1925 (Sunday)
The films Kentucky Pride directed by John Ford, The Coming of Amos directed by Cecil B. DeMille, and Pretty Ladies starring ZaSu Pitts were released. 
Dietzen, a new colony on Scoresby Sund in Greenland, was established by Denmark.
Tipperary defeated Galway on a score line of 5-6 to 1-5 in the All-Ireland Senior Hurling Championship Final.

September 7, 1925 (Monday)
An attempt by Spanish troops to make an amphibious landing at Alhucemas Bay ended in disaster. The Spanish withdrew after losing 500 men.
The Treze Futebol Clube was founded in Brazil.
Amidst unrest in Shanghai, rioting occurred; several were wounded as British police fired on a crowd of over 2,000 demonstrators protesting unequal treaties.
Born: Laura Ashley, fashion designer, in Dowlais, Wales (d. 1985)
Died: René Viviani, 61, 81st Prime Minister of France

September 8, 1925 (Tuesday)
The Spanish attempted a second amphibious landing at Alhucemas Bay, this time successful, after a preliminary bombardment and a feint landing near Cape Tres Forcas.
It was announced that explorer Roald Amundsen had signed a deal with the Italian government to use the dirigible N-1 in another attempt to fly to the North Pole, to be undertaken in 1926.
Born: Peter Sellers, comedic actor, in Portsmouth, England (d. 1980)

September 9, 1925 (Wednesday)
Rif rebels surrounded Tétouan.
Russian composer Igor Stravinsky completed Serenade for piano in A major in Vienna.
In Detroit, a white mob attempted to drive a black family out of the home they had purchased in a white neighborhood. A white man was shot dead in the struggle. Homeowner Dr. Ossian Sweet was among those arrested and charged with murder and a famous criminal case dealing with race relations in America would result.

September 10, 1925 (Thursday)
John Rodgers and his crew were spotted by a U.S. submarine as they sailed their disabled PN-9 seaplane toward Nawiliwili Harbor at Kauai, nine days after they had gone missing when it went down in the Pacific Ocean. The minesweeper USS Tanager was dispatched and towed them to shore.
French troops led by Marshal Philippe Pétain launched a new offensive against the Rif rebels north of the Ouergha River.
Born: Boris Tchaikovsky, composer, in Moscow, Soviet Union (d. 1996)

September 11, 1925 (Friday)
The British, French and German governments agreed in principle on a security pact, and began planning a conference to arrange for a formal treaty.
Miss California, Fay Lanphier, was crowned the winner of the 5th Miss America pageant in Atlantic City, New Jersey.

September 12, 1925 (Saturday)
The British Trades Union Congress adopted a resolution introduced by A. A. Purcell supporting "the right of all peoples in the British Empire to self-determination, including the right to choose complete separation from the Empire."
Born: Stan Lopata, baseball player, in Delray, Michigan (d. 2013)

September 13, 1925 (Sunday)
Western Union Telegraph announced it had established direct unbroken contact between San Francisco and London through a new invention enabling the automatic repetition of signals. Prior to this development, operators at interim points had to copy the message and send it on to the next relay point.
Xavier University of Louisiana, the first Catholic university for African-Americans in the world, opened.
Born:  Mel Tormé, jazz singer, in Chicago (d. 1999)

September 14, 1925 (Monday)
The stage production of The Jazz Singer opened on Broadway. George Jessel played the starring role which Al Jolson later made famous in the 1927 film version of the same name.
Rif pressure on Tétouan was relieved as Spanish reinforcements broke the siege.
 The Byzantine cross appeared in the sky over the city of Athens during an old calendar service, which at the time was being persecuted by the Greek authorities. The Police sent to end the service found themselves weeping alongside the thousands of others who witnessed the miracle. This event attracted many to the cause of preserving the old Greek Orthodox calendar and reinvigorated the faith of many embracing the secularity of the times.

September 15, 1925 (Tuesday)
Crown Prince Umberto of Italy automatically became a member of the Italian senate, as per the country's constitution, upon his twenty-first birthday.
Born: Helle Virkner, actress, in Gammel Rye, Denmark (d. 2009)

September 16, 1925 (Wednesday)
U.S. Secretary of State Frank B. Kellogg announced that British Communist politician Shapurji Saklatvala would not be allowed into the United States to attend the congress of the Inter-Parliamentary Union as a British delegate. Kellogg explained that this action was taken in response to revolutionary speeches made by Saklatvala, stating, "I do not believe we should admit foreigners to this country to preach anarchy or revolutionary overthrow of government."
Born: Charles Haughey, Taoiseach of Ireland, in Castlebar (d. 2006); B.B. King, blues musician, near Berclair, Mississippi (d. 2015)
Died: Alexander Friedmann, 37, Russian mathematician (typhoid fever)

September 17, 1925 (Thursday)
The American Civil Liberties Union sent a telegram to Secretary Kellogg protesting his decision to ban Shapurji Saklatvala from entering the country. Idaho Senator William Borah also criticized the decision, saying, "We have laws in this country to protect ourselves. If Saklatvala violates them he can be arrested. If he incites Americans to commit crimes, put him in jail."
In Mexico City, eighteen-year-old Frida Kahlo was almost killed in a serious accident when the bus she was riding in crashed into a streetcar. Kahlo sustained numerous injuries, including a fractured spinal column, which she never fully recovered from. It was during her two-year recovery in bed that she first began to paint.
Died: Carl Eytel, 63, German American artist

September 18, 1925 (Friday)
The Sultan of Morocco put a $25,000 bounty on the head of Rif leader Abd el-Krim.
U.S. President Coolidge defended the legality of Secretary of State Kellogg's decision to ban Shapurji Saklatvala from entering the country, as Saklatvala was not visiting in the capacity of an official government representative. 
H.P. Lovecraft wrote the short story In the Vault.
Born: Harvey Haddix, baseball player, in Medway, Ohio (d. 1994)

September 19, 1925 (Saturday)
The U.S. State Department warned that American citizens participating in the Rif War may be subject to prosecution for "high misdemeanour". An escadrille of American pilots was known to be flying for the French side.
In New Zealand, Wellington YMCA defeated Seacliff AFC to win the 1925 Chatham Cup of football.
Born: Franklin Sousley, United States Marine and flag raiser on Iwo Jima, in Hill Top, Kentucky (d. 1945)

September 20, 1925 (Sunday)
The Villa Literno–Napoli Gianturco railway opened in Italy, Rome's first underground rail line. 
The Harold Lloyd comedy film The Freshman was released.
Independiente F.B.C. was founded in Paraguay.

September 21, 1925 (Monday)
All telephone and telegraph workers in Paris staged a surprise two-hour walkout as a protest against low salaries.
The War Memorial Auditorium in Nashville, Tennessee was dedicated.

September 22, 1925 (Tuesday)
The film The Circle starring Eleanor Boardman was released.
The Jerome Kern stage musical Sunny opened on Broadway.

September 23, 1925 (Wednesday)
Princess Mafalda of Savoy married Philipp of Hesse.
The Pittsburgh Pirates clinched the National League pennant with a 2–1 win over the Philadelphia Phillies.
Born: Denis C. Twitchett, Cambridge scholar of Chinese history, in London (d. 2006)

September 24, 1925 (Thursday)
In the Great Syrian Revolt, French troops captured the Druze city of As-Suwayda.
The Washington Senators clinched their second straight American League pennant by sweeping a doubleheader against the Cleveland Indians. 
Born: Autar Singh Paintal, Indian medical scientist, in Mogok, Burma (d. 2004)

September 25, 1925 (Friday)
The U.S. submarine  was sunk off the coast of Rhode Island in a collision with a merchant steamer; only three of her crew survived.

September 26, 1925 (Saturday)
Germany accepted an invitation to attend a European security conference set to open October 5, with the Swiss town of Locarno set as the likely location.
Born: Bobby Shantz, baseball player, in Pottstown, Pennsylvania (alive in 2021)

September 27, 1925 (Sunday)
Hundreds died in Shandong Province as the Yellow River overflowed in China, the worst flooding since the 1887 deluge.
Norwegian athlete Charles Hoff broke his own pole vault record again with a height of 4.25 metres at a meet in Turku, Finland.
The war film The Dark Angel and the drama film The Mystic opened.
Born: Robert Edwards, physiologist, in Batley, England (d. 2013)
Rashtriya Swayamsevak Sangh (RSS) was established by Dr. Kesav Baliram Hedgevar, in India.

September 28, 1925 (Monday)
The American Debt Funding Commission handed France a plan for settlement of French debt from loans during the war, which would see France pay $40 million a year on a total obligation of over $3.3 billion plus interest.
Born: Cromwell Everson, composer, in Beaufort West, South Africa (d. 1991); Carolyn Morris, baseball player, in Phoenix, Arizona (d. 1996)

September 29, 1925 (Tuesday)
The British Foreign Office said that the Treaty of Versailles, particularly Article 231, would not be up for revision at the upcoming Locarno conference. A communique about the conference included the statement, "The question of Germany's responsibility for the war is not raised by the proposed pact. We are at a loss to know why the German government thought it proper to raise it at this moment, and are obliged to observe that the negotiation of a security pact cannot modify the Treaty of Versailles nor alter the judgment of the past."
At a party congress in Liverpool, Britain's Labour Party overwhelmingly voted against a merger with the Communist Party of Great Britain and to exclude communists from their membership ranks.
Born: Paul MacCready, aeronautical engineer, in New Haven, Connecticut (d. 2007)
Died: Léon Bourgeois, 74, French statesman, recipient of the Nobel Peace Prize

September 30, 1925 (Wednesday)
Greek dictator Theodoros Pangalos dissolved the country's Constituent Assembly, explaining that it had lost the confidence of the nation and presented an obstacle to its recovery. Pangalos said new elections would be conducted.
A Vatican committee issued a circular to the directors of pilgrimages notifying them that women found in churches not wearing opaque clothing that covered their head, collar, legs and upper arms would be ejected.
Jewelry valued at $750,000 was stolen from the six-room Plaza Hotel suite of Woolworth heiress Mrs. Jessie Woolworth Donahue, daughter of F.W. Woolworth. They were stolen in broad daylight from her bedroom while she was in the bathtub a few feet away.
Born: Arkady Ostashev, Soviet, Russian scientist, participant in the launch of the first artificial Earth satellite and the first cosmonaut, Candidate of Technical Sciences, Docent, laureate of the Lenin and state prizes, in village Maly Vasilyev, Moscow Oblast, Soviet Union (d. 1998)

References

1925
1925-09
1925-09